The Softball Superior Nacional (SSN) is a semi-pro women's softball league in Puerto Rico.

Currently contested of 10 teams, it has nevertheless had presence in several cities of Puerto Rico.

History

League Structure

List of teams

Current Teams
This current league organization features 10 teams in a single division.

Defunct Teams

Regular Season Format

Playoffs

Championships by franchise(all-time)

Recent Champions

References

Women's sports leagues in Puerto Rico
Softball in Puerto Rico
Women's softball